In mathematics, the continuous dual Hahn polynomials are a family of orthogonal polynomials in the Askey scheme of hypergeometric orthogonal polynomials. They are  defined in terms of generalized hypergeometric functions by 

 give a detailed list of their properties.

Closely related polynomials include the dual Hahn polynomials Rn(x;γ,δ,N), the continuous Hahn polynomials pn(x,a,b), and the Hahn polynomials. These polynomials all have q-analogs with an extra parameter q, such as the q-Hahn polynomials Qn(x;α,β, N;q), and so on.

Relation to other polynomials

Wilson polynomials are a generalization of continuous dual Hahn polynomials

References

Special hypergeometric functions
Orthogonal polynomials